Rhamphophasma is a genus of stick insects in the tribe Clitumnini, erected by Carl Brunner von Wattenwyl in 1893.  Species have been recorded from: China, Vietnam, India, Myanmar and Japan (possibly incomplete).

Species
The Phasmida Species File lists:
 Rhamphophasma dianicum Chen & He, 1994
 Rhamphophasma japanicum Brunner von Wattenwyl, 1907
 Rhamphophasma mallati Brunner von Wattenwyl, 1907
 Rhamphophasma modestum Brunner von Wattenwyl, 1893 - type species
 Rhamphophasma obtusum Ho, 2017
 Rhamphophasma pseudomodestum Ho, 2017
 Rhamphophasma serratum Ho, 2017
 Rhamphophasma spinicorne (Stål, 1875)
 Rhamphophasma vile Brunner von Wattenwyl, 1907

References

External links

Phasmatodea genera
Phasmatodea of Asia
Phasmatidae